The men's road race competition of the cycling events at the 2011 Pan American Games was held on October 22 at the Guadalajara Circuit in Guadalajara. The defending Pan American Games champion was Wendy Cruz of the Dominican Republic.

Schedule

Results
53 competitors from 21 countries competed.

References

External links
Road cycling schedule

Cycling at the 2011 Pan American Games
2011 in road cycling
Road cycling at the Pan American Games